Aleksandr Vyacheslavovich Arsoyev (born 14 June 1990) is a former Russian professional football player.

Club career
He made his Russian Football National League debut for FC Alania Vladikavkaz on 28 August 2009 in a game against FC Sibir Novosibirsk.

External links
 

1990 births
People from Tskhinvali
Living people
Russian footballers
FC Dynamo Moscow reserves players
FC Spartak Vladikavkaz players
CSF Bălți players
Russian expatriate footballers
Expatriate footballers in Moldova
Association football midfielders
Moldovan Super Liga players